Politics of Artsakh takes place within the constraints of a written constitution, approved by a popular vote, that recognises three branches of government: executive, legislative and judicial. The executive branch of government is exercised within a framework of a presidential representative democratic republic, whereby the President of Artsakh is both the head of state and the head of government. The legislative branch of government is composed of both the Government and the National Assembly. Elections to the National Assembly are on the basis of a multi-party system. As of 2009, the American-based non-governmental organisation, Freedom House, ranks Artsakh above both Armenia and Azerbaijan in terms of political and civil rights.  The republic is de facto independent and de jure a part of Azerbaijan. None of the elections in Artsakh are recognised by international bodies such as the OSCE Minsk Group, the European Union or the Organisation of Islamic Cooperation. Both Azerbaijan and Turkey have condemned the elections and called them a source of increased tensions.

Executive branch

|President
|Arayik Harutyunyan
|Free Motherland
|21 May 2020
|}

The President is directly elected for a five-year term, by popular vote.

Current government

Legislative branch

The National Assembly (Azgayin Zhoghov) has 33 members who are elected for a five-year term by Party-list proportional representation. Artsakh has a multi-party system, with numerous political parties in which no one party often has a chance of gaining power alone, and parties must work with each other to form coalition governments.

Judicial branch
Narine Narimanyan is the Head of the Supreme Court of the Republic of Artsakh.

Latest elections

Presidential election

Parliamentary election

See also
 Electoral calendar
 Electoral system
 Elections in Artsakh
 Foreign relations of Artsakh
 List of political parties in Artsakh
 Armenakan Party (Nagorno-Karabakh)
 National Assembly (Artsakh)
 Politics of Armenia

References

External links
 The Artsakh Republic Central Electoral Commission